Armera Tukaj (born 25 March 2001) is an Albanian footballer who plays as a forward for Apolonia and the Albania national team.

International career
Tukaj made her debut for the Albania national team on 9 April 2021, against Bosnia and Herzegovina.

See also
List of Albania women's international footballers

References

2001 births
Living people
Women's association football forwards
Albanian women's footballers
Albania women's international footballers
Footballers from Shkodër
Albanian footballers
FK Apolonia Fier (women) players